Bangalaia albata is a species of beetle in the family Cerambycidae. It was described by James Thomson in 1868. It is known from Nigeria, Sierra Leone, and the Democratic Republic of the Congo.

References

Prosopocerini
Beetles described in 1868